The Robert Stempel College of Public Health & Social Work at Florida International University (FIU), located in Miami, Florida, in the United States is one of FIU's 26 schools and colleges, composed of the School of Public Health, the School of Social Work, the Department of Dietetics and Nutrition, and the Academy for International Disaster Preparedness. The dean of the college is Tomás R. Guilarte.  The school was founded by the now defunct College of Health and Urban Affairs of Florida International University, honoring faculty member Robert R. Stempel. Stempel joined the faculty in the Department of Public Health in 1991 and was promoted to associate professor with tenure in 1995. He was responsible for developing most of the courses in the Master of Public Health epidemiology track and was well known and respected for his graduate-level courses on AIDS Epidemiology, Behavioral Epidemiology, and International Public Health.

In the 2023 U.S. News & World Report rankings, among public universities, the School of Public Health ranked 39th and the School of Social Work ranked 49th. 

Guide to Online Schools ranked Stempel College’s online Master of Public Health 15th in the country, based on return on investment; and the program was ranked 10th best Online Master of Public Health by PublicHealth.org. 

Stempel College’s School of Public Health ranked 16th in the country in most National Institutes of Health (NIH) funded public health programs at public universities, according to The Blue Ridge Institute for Medical Research.

The Dietetics and Nutrition program at Stempel College ranks 4th for overall best program by College Factual, a website designed to help college-bound students identify their best fit in higher education. Additionally, the dietetics and nutrition program ranked first for veterans, second for non-traditional students, sixth for most popular and ninth for best value. For the ranking, College Factual compared 66 dietetics and nutrition programs nationwide.

School of Public Health
The initial strategic plan for the School of Public Health was drafted by a Strategic Planning Committee, using the results of a SWOT (strengths, weaknesses, opportunities, and threats) analysis conducted in a faculty retreat in 2004. The committee was composed of Department Chairs, a representative from the Executive Dean’s office, Associate Deans, and a graduate student representative. The plan was approved by faculty in January 2005, following a review by the External Advisory Committee. The initial plan guided us through our accreditation site visit in October 2006. Another Strategic Planning Committee revised the plan with a view toward 5–10 years in the future.  The school was created with $1 million gifts from the Starr Foundation and the Stempel Foundation. The $2 million total will receive a 75 percent match from the state to create the Robert Stempel Foundation to support activities in the new school. On 2008, the RSSPH joined the School of Social Work, previously part of the College of Social Work, Criminal Justice and Public Affairs of Florida International University, to form the new college.

Accreditation
The School of Public Health is fully accredited through July 1, 2027 by the Council on Education for Public Health (CEPH). The school received its initial CEPH accreditation in 1993 and was last re-accredited in June 2020 in a report demonstrating full compliance across all CEPH criteria.

School of Social Work
The Social Work Program was established in 1972, when the university began offering academic programs. The School offers undergraduate and graduate programs leading to the Bachelors (BSSW) and Masters (MSW) and Doctor of Philosophy (Ph.D.) degrees in Social Work. The BSSW program was one of the first degree program offerings in the university and has been accredited since July, 1974, by the Council on Social Work Education (CSWE). The MSW degree program has been offered since August, 1981 and received full accreditation status from CSWE in April 1986.

Department of Dietetics and Nutrition
The Dietetics and Nutrition programs are accredited by the Commission on Accreditation for Dietetics Education (CADE).

Facilities 
The Robert Stempel College of Public Health & Social Work is located in Academic Health Center 5 (AHC5) on Florida International University's main campus. The Office of the Dean and most departments are housed in the AHC5 with labs in both Academic Health Center 1 and 2. The Academy for International Disaster Preparedness is located in PG5, in offices shared with the university's Emergency Operations Center.

References

External links 
 
 Florida International University

Florida International University
Educational institutions established in 2006
Schools of public health in the United States
Schools of social work in the United States
2006 establishments in Florida
Medical and health organizations based in Florida